Mataró is the capital and largest town of the comarca of the Maresme, in the province of Barcelona, Catalonia Autonomous Community, Spain. , it had a population of c. 122,932 inhabitants.

History

Mataró dates back to Roman times when it was a village known as "Iluro" or "Illuro". The ruins of a first-century BC Roman bath house (known locally as the Torre Llauder) were recently discovered and can be visited. The coastal  follows the same path as the original Roman road, Via Augusta.

Mataró was declared a city by royal decree, even though at the time (nineteenth century) the population fell short of the requirement for city status.

The first railway in peninsular Spain was the Mataró – Barcelona line which opened on 28 October 1848 by the Catalan businessman and Mataró native Miquel Biada. This line now forms part of the Renfe/Rodalies de Catalunya R1 suburban service between L'Hospitalet de Llobregat and Maçanet-Massanes.

During the 1992 Summer Olympics in Barcelona, Mataró was the starting point for the marathon events.

Main sights
Mataró is the birthplace of noucentista architect Josep Puig i Cadafalch, who designed the ajuntament (town hall) and several other notable buildings in the town:
 Casa Coll i Regàs.
 Casa Parera.
 Casa Sisternes.
 El Rengle.
 Hermitage of St. Simon.
 La Beneficiència.

Nearby the town are the archaeological remains of the Roman villa of Can Llauder.

Agriculture
The traditional vineyards were devastated by Phylloxera in the nineteenth century and only partially replanted, due to the growth of the tourist industry and the development of irrigation in the area. Potatoes were one of the first replacement crops to be introduced, especially the Royal Kidney variety, and Mataró obtained a Denominació d'Origen in 1932. Trocadero lettuce and peas are also grown, mostly for export. The production of cut flowers is less important than in other towns of the Maresme.

In modern viticulture, the red mourvèdre grape variety is a better-known synonym for the grape known in Spain, the U.S., and Australia as mataro. Mataró, the city, is thought to be the likely origin of mataro, the wine grape.

Climate
Mataró has a borderline humid subtropical climate (Cfa in Köppen climate classification) bordering with a Hot-summer mediterranean climate, (Köppen Csa).

Festivals, celebrations and events

Several major events are celebrated annually in Mataró. Some of them are also celebrated in the rest of Catalonia and others, which have a religious origin, are part of the folklore and traditions of Spain and some other countries. Among all of them the most popular ones are:
 The three wise men in Mataró.
 Carnival in Mataró: celebrated immediately before Lent.
 Easter in Mataró: celebrated every year during one week on a movable date from the end of March to the very beginning of May
 Saint George in Mataró: celebrated on 23 April. It is a big celebration although it is not a bank holiday.
 St. John the Baptist in Mataró: celebrated on 24 June
 Les Santes: local festivity of the city celebrated at the end of July. It involves the recognition of Saint Juliana and Saint Semproniana.
 The caga Tió: celebrated in Catalonia on Christmas’ Eve, 24 December.
 Mataró also celebrates several fairs such as: Tres Tombs and Saint Ponç. In May it is celebrated a fair called Mercat de Sant Ponç. At the fair handicraft products, medicinal herbs, natural products like: honey, cheese, fruits, flowers, jam and salami are sold. Sant Ponç is the patron saint of the herbalists and bee keepers. The fair has been done for centuries. Its origins date to the 16th century, when in Spring herbalists took medicine to the sick. Today Sant Ponç fair is celebrated to preserve the antique customs.
 Festival "Cultural Crossroad".
International Dance Festival "Days of Dance".

Twin towns
 Cehegín, Spain
 Dürnau, Germany
 Gammelshausen, Germany
 Créteil, France
 Corsico, Italy
 Fort Lauderdale, The United States of America

Notable people
 

Adoración Apolo (born 1979), Spanish retired footballer

See also
 Mataró Museum.
 Roman villa of Can Llauder.
 Can Marfà Knitwear Museum.

References

 Panareda Clopés, Josep Maria; Rios Calvet, Jaume; Rabella Vives, Josep Maria (1989). Guia de Catalunya, Barcelona: Caixa de Catalunya.  (Spanish).  (Catalan).

External links

 
 Government data pages 

 
Venues of the 1992 Summer Olympics
Olympic athletics venues
Municipalities in Maresme
Seaside resorts in Spain